Harold Mosby (26 June 1926 – 15 June 2007) was an English professional footballer who played as a forward. He is best remembered for his football at Rotherham United and Scunthorpe United. He played in the first ever football league team and game for Scunthorpe United against Shrewsbury Town in August 1950. He was also made a life member of Scunthorpe United. Scored winning goal in Worksop Town's most successful run in the FA Cup enabling them to reach the third round proper in 1955–56 season. This is still the furthest Worksop Town has gone in the competition.

Mosby also played 3 games scoring two goals for Huddersfield Town, just before the end of World War II, this was in the War Cup.

References

1926 births
2007 deaths
Footballers from Rotherham
English footballers
Association football wingers
Yorkshire Amateur A.F.C. players
Rotherham United F.C. players
Scunthorpe United F.C. players
Worksop Town F.C. players
Crewe Alexandra F.C. players
King's Lynn F.C. players
Scarborough F.C. players
Burton Albion F.C. players
Denaby United F.C. players
Rawmarsh Welfare F.C. players
Wigan Athletic F.C. players
English Football League players